This list is complete and up-to-date as of the 2022 season.
The following is a list of players, both past and current, who appeared at least in one game for the Los Angeles Dodgers National League franchise (1958–present), and for the Brooklyn-based teams known as the Atlantics (1884), Grays (1885–1887), Bridegrooms (1888–1890, 1896–1898), Grooms (1891–1895), Superbas (1899–1910), Dodgers (1911–1913, 1932–1957) and Robins (1914–1931).



Players in Bold are members of the National Baseball Hall of Fame.

Players in Italics have had their numbers retired by the team.

A

Don Aase, P, 1990
Bert Abbey, P, 1895–1896
Cal Abrams, OF, 1949–1952
Bobby Abreu, OF, 2012
Tony Abreu, IF, 2007, 2009
Terry Adams, P, 2000–2001
Morrie Aderholt, OF, 1944–1945
Hank Aguirre, P, 1968
Eddie Ainsmith, C, 1923
Raleigh Aitchison, P, 1911, 1914–1915
Hanser Alberto, IF, 2022
Ed Albosta, P, 1941
Luis Alcaraz, 2B/3B, 1967–1968
Doyle Alexander, P, 1971
Scott Alexander, P, 2018–2021
Dick Allen, IF/OF, 1971
Frank Allen, P, 1912–1914
Horace Allen, OF, 1919
Johnny Allen, P,  1941–1943
Luke Allen, OF, 2002
Mel Almada, OF, 1939
Yency Almonte, P, 2022
Sandy Alomar Jr., C, 2006
Whitey Alperman, 2B, 1906–1909
Eddy Alvarez, IF/OF, 2022
Orlando Alvarez, OF, 1973–1975
Víctor Alvarez, P, 2002–2003
Wilson Álvarez, P, 2003–2005
Ed Amelung, OF, 1984, 1986
Sandy Amorós, OF, 1952–1957, 1959–1960
Brett Anderson, P, 2015–2016
Dave Anderson, IF, 1983–1989, 1992
Ferrell Anderson, C, 1946
Garret Anderson, OF, 2010
John Anderson, 1B/OF, 1894–1899
Marlon Anderson, OF, 2006–2007
Tyler Anderson, P, 2022
Stan Andrews, C, 1944–1945
Pat Ankenman, 2B, 1943–1944
Eric Anthony, OF, 1997
Bill Antonello, OF, 1953
Ed Appleton, P, 1915–1916
Jimmy Archer, C, 1918
Danny Ardoin, C, 2008
Jamie Arnold, P, 1999–2000
Erisbel Arruebarrena, SS, 2014
Andy Ashby, P, 2001–2003
Billy Ashley, OF, 1992–1997
Bob Aspromonte, IF, 1956, 1960–1961
Pedro Astacio, P, 1992–1997
Rick Auerbach, SS, 1974–1976
Brad Ausmus, C, 2009–2010
Bruce Aven, OF, 2000–2001
Luis Avilán, P, 2015–2017
John Axford, P, 2018
Willy Aybar, IF, 2005–2006

B

Charlie Babb, SS, 1904–1905
Johnny Babich, P, 1934–1935
Danys Báez, P, 2006
Pedro Báez, P, 2014–2020
Bob Bailey, 3B, 1967–1968
Gene Bailey, OF, 1923–1924
Sweetbreads Bailey, P, 1921
Bob Bailor, IF, 1984–1985
Doug Baird, 3B, 1919–1920
Dusty Baker, OF, 1976–1983
Scott Baker, P, 2015
Tom Baker, P, 1935–1937
Paul Bako, C, 2005
James Baldwin, P, 2001
Lady Baldwin, P, 1890
Win Ballou, P, 1929
Dave Bancroft, SS, 1928–1929
Dan Bankhead, P, 1947, 1950–1951
Willie Banks, P, 1995
Jack Banta, P, 1947–1950
Rod Barajas, C, 2010–2011
Turner Barber, OF, 1923
Jim Barbieri, OF, 1966
Cy Barger, P, 1910–1912
Red Barkley, IF, 1943
Austin Barnes, C/IF, 2015–2022
Brian Barnes, P, 1994
Jesse Barnes, P, 1926–1927
Larry Barnes, 1B, 2003
Darwin Barney, IF, 2014–2015
Rex Barney, P, 1943, 1946–1950
Bob Barr, P, 1935
Bob Barrett, 3B, 1925, 1927
Manuel Barrios, P, 1998
Boyd Bartley, SS, 1943
Al Bashang, OF, 1918
Eddie Basinski, IF, 1944–1945
Emil Batch, 3B/OF, 1904–1907
Trevor Bauer, P, 2021
Jim Baxes, 3B, 1959
Mike Baxter, OF, 2014
Brandon Beachy, P, 2015
Billy Bean, OF, 1989
Matt Beaty, 1B/OF, 2019–2021
Boom-Boom Beck, P, 1933–1934
Erve Beck, 2B, 1899
Josh Beckett, P, 2012–2014
Joe Beckwith, P, 1986
Hank Behrman, P, 1946–1948
Joe Beimel P, 2006–2008
Kevin Beirne, P, 2002
Mark Belanger, SS, 1982
Wayne Belardi, 1B, 1950–1951, 1953–1954
Tim Belcher, P, 1987–1991
Ronald Belisario, P, 2009–2010, 2012–2013
Frank Bell, C/OF, 1885
George Bell, P, 1907–1911
Ronnie Belliard, IF, 2009–2010
Cody Bellinger, 1B/OF, 2017–2022
Adrián Beltré, 3B, 1998–2004
Ray Benge, P, 1933–1935
Ike Benners, OF, 1884
Gary Bennett, C, 2008
Todd Benzinger, 1B/OF, 1992
Moe Berg, C, 1923
Bill Bergen, C, 1904–1911
Roger Bernadina, OF, 2014
Ray Berres, C, 1934, 1936
Ángel Berroa, SS, 2008
Gerónimo Berroa, OF, 2000
Don Bessent, P, 1955–1958
Wilson Betemit, 3B, 2006–2007
Mookie Betts, OF, 2020–2022
Phil Bickford, P, 2021–2022
Steve Bilko, 1B, 1958
Jack Billingham, P, 1968
Chad Billingsley, P, 2006–2013
Ralph Birkofer, P, 1937
Babe Birrer, P,  1958
Del Bissonette, 1B, 1928–1931, 1933
Joe Black, P, 1952–1955
Casey Blake, 3B, 2008–2011
Henry Blanco, C, 1997
Joe Blanton, P, 2012, 2016
Clarence Blethen, P, 1929
Mike Blowers, 3B, 1996
Lu Blue, 1B, 1933
Hiram Bocachica, IF/OF, 2000–2002
Doug Bochtler, P, 1999
George Boehler, P, 1926
Tim Bogar, IF, 2001
Brian Bohanon, P, 1998
Sam Bohne, 2B, 1926
Jack Bolling, 1B, 1944
Mike Bolsinger, P, 2015–2016
Bobby Bonilla, 3B/OF, 1998
Frank Bonner, 2B, 1896
Ike Boone, OF, 1930–1932
Pedro Borbón Jr., P, 1999
Frenchy Bordagaray, IF/OF, 1935–1936, 1942–1945
Bob Borkowski, OF, 1955
Rafael Bournigal, IF, 1992–1994
Ken Boyer, 3B, 1968–1969
Buzz Boyle, OF, 1933–1935
Gibby Brack, OF, 1937–1938
Mark Bradley, OF, 1981–1982
Milton Bradley, OF, 2004–2005
Joe Bradshaw, P, 1929
Bobby Bragan, SS, 1943–1944, 1947–1948
Ralph Branca, P, 1944–1953, 1956
Ed Brandt, P, 1936
Jeff Branson, IF, 2000–2001
Yhency Brazobán, P, 2004–2008
Sid Bream, 1B, 1983–1985
Marv Breeding, 1B, 1963
Tom Brennan, P, 1985
William Brennan, P, 1988
Rube Bressler, OF, 1928–1931
Ken Brett, P, 1979
Jim Brewer, P, 1964–1975
Tony Brewer, OF, 1984
Rocky Bridges, IF, 1951–1952
Greg Brock, 1B,  1982–1986
Matt Broderick, 2B, 1903
Troy Brohawn, P, 2003
Hubie Brooks, OF, 1990
Jerry Brooks, OF, 1993
Dan Brouthers, 1B, 1892–1893
Eddie Brown, OF, 1924–1925
Elmer Brown, P, 1913–1915
John Brown, P, 1897
Kevin Brown, P, 1999–2003
Lindsay Brown, SS, 1937
Lloyd Brown, P, 1925
Mace Brown, P, 1941
Tommy Brown, IF/OF, 1944–1951
George Browne, OF, 1911
Pete Browning, OF, 1894
Jonathan Broxton, P, 2005–2011
Bruce Brubaker, P, 1967
Justin Bruihl, P, 2021–2022
Jacob Brumfield, OF, 1999
Will Brunson, P, 1998
Jim Bruske, P, 1995–1996, 1998
Ralph Bryant, OF, 1985–1987
Jim Bucher, 3B, 1934–1937
Bill Buckner, 1B/OF, 1969–1976
Walker Buehler, P, 2017–2022
Cy Buker, P, 1945
Jim Bunning, P, 1969
Al Burch, OF, 1907–1911
Ernie Burch, OF, 1886–1887
Jack Burdock, 2B,  1888, 1891
Sandy Burk, P, 1910–1912
Glenn Burke, OF, 1976–1978
Jeromy Burnitz, OF, 2003
Andy Burns, IF, 2021
Oyster Burns, OF, 1888–1895
Buster Burrell, C, 1895–1897
Larry Burright, 2B, 1962
Mike Busch, 3B, 1995–1996
Doc Bushong, C, 1888–1890
Nick Buss, OF, 2013
Max Butcher, P, 1936–1938
Drew Butera, C, 2013–2014
Brett Butler, OF, 1991–1997
John Butler, C, 1906–1907
Johnny Butler, SS, 1926–1927

C

Enos Cabell, IF/OF, 1985–1986
Jolbert Cabrera, IF/OF, 2002–2003
Leon Cadore, P, 1915–1923
Bruce Caldwell, 1B/OF, 1932
Leo Callahan, OF, 1913
Alberto Callaspo, IF, 2015
Dick Calmus, P, 1963
Dolph Camilli, 1B, 1938–1943
Doug Camilli, C, 1960–1964
Roy Campanella, C, 1948–1957
Al Campanis, 2B, 1943
Jim Campanis, C, 1966–1968
Gilly Campbell, C, 1938
Jim Canavan, 2B, 1897
John Candelaria, P, 1991–1992
Tom Candiotti, P, 1992–1997
Chris Cannizzaro, C, 1972–1973
Guy Cantrell, P, 1925, 1927
Ben Cantwell, P, 1937
Chris Capuano, P, 2012–2013
Andy Carey, 3B, 1962
Max Carey, OF, 1926–1929
Tex Carleton, P, 1940
Buddy Carlyle, P, 2005
Giovanni Carrara, P, 2001–2002, 2004–2006
Jamey Carroll, IF, 2010–2011
Ownie Carroll, P, 1933–1934
Kid Carsey, P, 1901
Gary Carter, C, 1991
Lance Carter, P, 2006
Bob Caruthers, P/OF, 1888–1891
Doc Casey, 3B, 1899–1900, 1906–1907
Hugh Casey, P, 1939–1942, 1946–1948
John Cassidy, OF, 1884–1885
Pete Cassidy, 1B, 1899
Alex Castellanos, OF, 2012–2013
Bobby Castillo, P, 1977–1981, 1985
Fabio Castillo, P, 2017
Juan Castro, IF, 1995–1999, 2009–2011
Tom Catterson, OF, 1908–1909
César Cedeño, OF, 1986
Roger Cedeño, OF, 1995–1998
Ron Cey, 3B, 1971–1982
Ed Chandler, P, 1947
Ben Chapman, OF, 1944–1945
Glenn Chapman, OF, 1934
J. T. Chargois, P, 2018–2019
Jesse Chavez, P, 2016
Robinson Checo, P, 1999
Chin-Feng Chen, OF, 2002–2005
Larry Cheney, P, 1915–1919
Paul Chervinko, C, 1937–1938
Bob Chipman, P, 1941–1944
Randy Choate, P, 2012
Hee-seop Choi, 1B, 2004–2005
McKay Christensen, OF, 2001
Mike Christopher, P, 1991
Chuck Churn, P, 1959
Gino Cimoli, OF, 1956–1958
Tony Cingrani, P, 2017–2018
George Cisar, OF, 1937
Moose Clabaugh, OF, 1926
Bud Clancy, 1B, 1932
Bob Clark, C/OF, 1886–1890
Brady Clark, OF, 2007
Dave Clark, OF, 1996
Watty Clark, P, 1927–1933, 1934–1937
Garrett Cleavinger, P, 2021–2022
Wally Clement, OF, 1909
Brad Clontz, P, 1998
Todd Coffey, P, 2012
Alta Cohen, OF, 1931–1932
Rocky Colavito, OF, 1968
Louis Coleman, P 2016
Bill Collins, OF, 1913
Hub Collins, 2B/OF, 1888–1892
Jackie Collum, P, 1957–1958
Steve Colyer, P, 2003
Chuck Connors, 1B, 1949
Jim Conway, P, 1884
Dennis Cook, P, 1990–1991
Brent Cookson, OF, 1999
Jack Coombs, P, 1915–1918
Ron Coomer, 1B/3B, 2003
Johnny Cooney, OF, 1935–1937, 1943–1944
Alex Cora, IF, 1998–2004
Claude Corbitt, IF, 1945
Daniel Corcino, P, 2018
Jack Corcoran, C, 1884
Tommy Corcoran, SS, 1892–1896
Bryan Corey, P, 2002
Chuck Corgan, IF, 1925, 1927
Pop Corkhill, OF, 1888–1890
Lance Cormier, P, 2011
Kevin Correia, P, 2014
John Corriden, PR, 1946
Pete Coscarart, IF, 1938–1941
Daniel Coulombe, P, 2014–2015
Bob Coulson, OF, 1910–1911
Craig Counsell, IF, 1999
Wes Covington, OF, 1966
Billy Cox, 3B, 1948–1954
Dick Cox, OF, 1925–1926
George Crable, P, 1910
Roger Craig, P, 1955–1961
Ed Crane, P/OF, 1893
Sam Crane, SS, 1922
Carl Crawford, OF, 2013–2016
Willie Crawford, OF, 1964–1975
Tim Crews, P, 1987–1992
Claude Crocker, P, 1944–1945
Tripp Cromer, IF, 1997–1999
Jack Cronin, P, 1895, 1904
Bubba Crosby, OF, 2003
Lave Cross, 3B, 1900
Bill Crouch, P, 1939
Don Crow, C, 1982
Henry Cruz, OF, 1975–1976
José Cruz Jr., OF, 2005–2006
Luis Cruz, IF, 2012–2013
Tony Cuccinello, 2B, 1932–1935
Charlie Culberson, IF, 2016–2017
Roy Cullenbine, OF, 1940
Nick Cullop, OF, 1929
George Culver, P, 1973
John Cummings, P, 1995–1996
Bert Cunningham, P, 1887
Chad Curtis, OF, 1996
Cliff Curtis, P, 1912–1913
George Cutshaw, 2B, 1912–1917
Kiki Cuyler, OF, 1938

D

Omar Daal, P, 1993–1995, 2002
Bill Dahlen, SS, 1899–1903, 1910–1911
Babe Dahlgren, 1B, 1942
Con Daily, C, 1891–1895
Jud Daley, OF, 1911–1912
Jack Dalton, OF, 1910, 1914
Tom Daly, C/2B, 1891–1901
Jake Daniel, 1B, 1937
Kal Daniels, OF, 1989–1992
Fats Dantonio, C, 1944–1945
Cliff Dapper, C, 1942
Travis d'Arnaud, PH, 2019
Bob Darnell, P, 1954, 1956
Yu Darvish, P, 2017
Bobby Darwin, OF, 1962, 1969, 1971
Dan Daub, P, 1893–1897
Jake Daubert, 1B, 1910–1918
Vic Davalillo, OF, 1977–1980
Bill Davidson, OF, 1910–1911
Butch Davis, OF, 1991
Curt Davis, P, 1940–1946
Eric Davis, OF, 1992–1993
Lefty Davis, OF, 1901
Mike Davis, OF, 1988–1989
Otis Davis, OF, 1946
Ron Davis, P, 1987
Tommy Davis, OF, 1959–1966
Willie Davis, OF, 1960–1973
Pea Ridge Day, P, 1931
Grant Dayton, P, 2016–2017
Iván DeJesús Jr., IF, 2011–2012
Iván DeJesús, SS, 1974–1976
Rubby De La Rosa, P, 2011–2012
José De León, P, 2016
Lindsay Deal, OF, 1939
Tommy Dean, SS, 1967
Hank DeBerry, OF, 1922–1930
Art Decatur, P, 1922–1925
Artie Dede, C, 1916
Rod Dedeaux, SS, 1935
Pat Deisel, C, 1902
Wheezer Dell, P, 1915–1917
Bert Delmas, 2B, 1933
Don Demeter, OF, 1956, 1958–1961
Gene DeMontreville, IF, 1900
Rick Dempsey, C, 1988–1990
Eddie Dent, P, 1909, 1911–1912
Delino DeShields, 2B, 1994–1996
John DeSilva, P, 1993
Rube Dessau, P, 1910
Elmer Dessens, P, 2004–2006
Mike Devereaux, OF, 1987–1988, 1998
Blake DeWitt, 2B/3B, 2008–2010
Carlos Díaz, P, 1984–1986
Einar Díaz, C, 2006
Leo Dickerman, P, 1923–1924
O'Koyea Dickson, OF, 2017
Dick Dietz, C, 1972
Pop Dillon, 1B, 1904
Bill Doak, P, 1924, 1927–1928
John Dobbs, OF, 1903–1905
George Dockins, P, 1947
Cozy Dolan, OF, 1901–1902
José Dominguez, P, 2013–2014
Chris Donnels, 3B, 2000–2001
Bill Donovan, P, 1899–1902
Patsy Donovan, OF, 1890, 1906–1907
Mickey Doolan, SS, 1918
Jerry Dorgan, C/OF, 1884
Jack Doscher, P, 1903–1906
Octavio Dotel, P, 2010
John Douglas, 1B, 1945
Phil Douglas, P, 1915
Snooks Dowd, IF, 1926
Red Downey, OF, 1909
Al Downing, P, 1971–1977
Red Downs, 2B, 1912
Carl Doyle, P, 1939–1940
Jack Doyle, 1B, 1903–1904
Brian Dozier, IF, 2018
Solly Drake, OF, 1959
Tom Drake, P, 1941
Darren Dreifort, P, 1994, 1996–2001, 2003–2004
J. D. Drew, OF, 2005–2006
Don Drysdale, P, 1956–1969
Clise Dudley, P, 1929–1930
John Duffie, P, 1967
Mariano Duncan, 2B, 1985–1987, 1989
Jack Dunn, P/3B, 1897–1900
Joe Dunn, C, 1908–1909
Bull Durham, P, 1904
Rich Durning, P, 1917–1918
Leo Durocher, SS, 1938–1941, 1943, 1945
Red Durrett, OF, 1944–1945

E

Billy Earle, C, 1894
George Earnshaw, P, 1935–1936
Mal Eason, P, 1905–1906
Eddie Eayrs, OF, 1921
Ox Eckhardt, OF, 1936
Bruce Edwards, C, 1946–1951
Hank Edwards, OF, 1951
Mike Edwards, 3B, 2005
Dick Egan, 2B, 1914–1915
Dick Egan, P, 1967
Rube Ehrhardt, P, 1924–1928
Brett Eibner, OF, 2017
Joey Eischen, P, 1995–1996
Jim Eisenreich, OF, 1998
Harry Eisenstat, P, 1935–1937
Kid Elberfeld, SS, 1914
Scott Elbert, P, 2008–2012, 2014
Jumbo Elliott, P, 1925, 1927–1930
Rowdy Elliott, C, 1920
A. J. Ellis, C, 2008–2016
Mark Ellis, 2B, 2012–2013
Robert Ellis, P, 2002
Kevin Elster, SS, 2000
Don Elston, P, 1957
Bones Ely, SS, 1891
John Ely, P, 2010–2012
Juan Encarnación, OF, 2004
Gil English, 3B, 1944
Woody English, IF, 1937–1938
Johnny Enzmann, P, 1914
Nathan Eovaldi, P, 2011–2012
Al Epperly, P, 1950
Scott Erickson, P, 2005
Robbie Erlin, P, 2022
Carl Erskine, P, 1948–1959
Tex Erwin, C, 1910–1914
Cecil Espy, OF, 1983
Chuck Essegian, OF, 1959–1960
Dude Esterbrook, 3B, 1891
Andre Ethier, OF, 2006–2017
Red Evans, P, 1939
Roy Evans, P, 1902–1903
Dana Eveland, P, 2011

F

Bunny Fabrique, SS, 1916–1917
Jim Fairey, OF, 1968, 1973
Ron Fairly, 1B/OF, 1958–1969
Brian Falkenborg, P, 2004, 2008
George Fallon, IF, 1937
Alex Farmer, C, 1908
Kyle Farmer, C/IF, 2017–2018
Duke Farrell, C, 1899–1902
Turk Farrell, P, 1961
John Farrow, C, 1884
Jim Faulkner, P, 1930
Tim Federowicz, C, 2011–2014
Gus Felix, OF, 1926–1927
Neftalí Feliz, P, 2021
Alex Ferguson, P, 1929
Caleb Ferguson, P, 2018–2020, 2022
Joe Ferguson, C/OF, 1970–1976, 1978–1981
Chico Fernández, SS, 1956
Sid Fernández, P, 1983
Al Ferrara, OF, 1963, 1965–1968
Wes Ferrell, P, 1940
Lou Fette, P, 1940
Mike Fetters, P, 2000–2001
Chick Fewster, 2B, 1926–1927
Josh Fields, P, 2016–2018
Casey Fien, P, 2016
Stephen Fife, P, 2012–2014
Chone Figgins, IF/OF, 2014
Jack Fimple, C, 1983–1984, 1986
Pembroke Finlayson, P, 1908–1909
Steve Finley, OF, 2004
Neal Finn, 2B, 1930–1932
Jeff Fischer, P, 1989
William Fischer, C, 1913–1914
Bob Fisher, SS, 1912–1913
Chauncey Fisher, P, 1897
Freddie Fitzsimmons, P, 1937–1943
Tom Fitzsimmons, 3B, 1919
Darrin Fletcher, C, 1989–1990
Sam Fletcher, P, 1909
Tim Flood, 2B, 1902–1903
José Flores, IF, 2004
Dylan Floro, P, 2018–2020
Jake Flowers, IF, 1927–1931, 1933
Wes Flowers, P, 1940–1944
Wilmer Font, P, 2017–2018
Chad Fonville, IF/OF, 1995–1997
Hod Ford, IF, 1925
Terry Forster, P, 1978–1982
Logan Forsythe, IF, 2017–2018
Alan Foster, P, 1967–1970
Jack Fournier, 1B, 1923–1926
Dave Foutz, P/1B/OF, 1888–1896
Art Fowler, P, 1959
Fred Frankhouse, P, 1936–1938
Jack Franklin, P, 1944
Herman Franks, C, 1940–1941
Johnny Frederick, OF, 1929–1934
Freddie Freeman, 1B, 2022
Mike Freeman, 3B, 2017
David Freese, IF, 2018–2019
Howard Freigau, 3B, 1928
Larry French, P, 1941–1942
Ray French, SS, 1923
Lonny Frey, IF, 1933–1936
Carlos Frías, P, 2014–2016
Pepe Frías, SS, 1980–1981
Charlie Fuchs, P, 1944
Nig Fuller, C, 1902
Rafael Furcal, SS, 2006–2011
Carl Furillo, OF, 1946–1960

G

Len Gabrielson, OF, 1967–1970
John Gaddy, P, 1938
Éric Gagné, P, 1999–2006
Greg Gagne, SS, 1996–1997
Augie Galan, OF, 1941–1946
Rocky Gale, C, 2018–2019
Joe Gallagher, OF, 1940
Phil Gallivan, P, 1931
Joey Gallo, OF, 2022
Balvino Gálvez, P, 1986
Karim García, OF, 1995–1997
Onelki García, P, 2013
Yimi García, P, 2014–2016, 2018–2019
Nomar Garciaparra, IF, 2006–2008
Jon Garland, P, 2009, 2011
Kyle Garlick, OF, 2019
Mike Garman, P, 1977–1978
Phil Garner, IF, 1987
Steve Garvey, 1B, 1969–1982
Ned Garvin, P, 1902–1904
Welcome Gaston, P, 1898–1899
Frank Gatins, 3B, 1901
Sid Gautreaux, C, 1936–1937
Billy Geer, SS, 1884
Jim Gentile, 1B, 1957–1958
Greek George, C, 1938
Ben Geraghty, IF, 1936
Doc Gessler, OF, 1903–1906
Gus Getz, 3B, 1914–1916
Bob Giallombardo, P, 1958
Jay Gibbons, 1B/OF, 2010–2011
Kirk Gibson, OF, 1988–1990
Charlie Gilbert, OF, 1940
Pete Gilbert, 3B, 1894
Shawn Gilbert, IF/OF, 2000
Wally Gilbert, 3B, 1928–1931
Carden Gillenwater, OF, 1943
Jim Gilliam, IF, 1953–1966
Héctor Giménez, C, 2011
Al Gionfriddo, OF, 1947
Tony Giuliani, C, 1940–1941
Roy Gleason, OF, 1963
Al Glossop, 2B, 1943
John Gochnauer, SS, 1901
Erik Goeddel, P, 2018
Jim Golden, P, 1960–1961
Dave Goltz, P, 1980–1982
Tony Gonsolin, P, 2019–2022
Adrián González, 1B, 2012–2017
José González, OF, 1985–1991
Luis González, OF, 2007
Victor González, P, 2020–2021
Johnny Gooch, C, 1928–1929
Ed Goodson, 1B/3B, 1976–1977
Tom Goodwin, OF, 1991–1993, 2000–2001
Ray Gordinier, P, 1921–1922
Dee Gordon, SS, 2011–2014
Terrance Gore, OF, 2020
Rick Gorecki, P, 1997
Jim Gott, P, 1990–1994
Billy Grabarkewitz, IF, 1969–1972
Jason Grabowski, OF, 2004–2005
Brusdar Graterol, P, 2020–2022
Jack Graham, 1B, 1946
Yasmani Grandal, C, 2015–2018
Curtis Granderson, OF, 2017
Mudcat Grant, P, 1968
Dick Gray, 3B, 1958–1959
Josiah Gray, P, 2021
Harvey Green, P, 1935
Nick Green, IF, 2010
Shawn Green, OF, 2000–2004
Conner Greene, P, 2021
Nelson Greene, P, 1924–1925
Shane Greene, P, 2021–2022
Kent Greenfield, P, 1929
Bill Greenwood, 2B, 1884
Ed Greer, OF, 1887
Hal Gregg, P, 1943–1947
Zack Greinke, P, 2013–2015
Alfredo Griffin, SS, 1988–1991
Mike Griffin, OF, 1891–1898
Bert Griffith, OF, 1922–1923
Derrell Griffith, 3B/OF, 1963–1966
Tommy Griffith, OF, 1919–1925
John Grim, C, 1895–1899
Burleigh Grimes, P, 1918–1926
Dan Griner, P, 1918
Lee Grissom, P, 1940–1941
Marquis Grissom, OF, 2001–2002
Kevin Gross, P, 1991–1994
Kip Gross, P, 1992–1993
Jerry Grote, C, 1977–1978, 1981
Michael Grove, P, 2022
Mark Grudzielanek, IF, 1998–2002
Javy Guerra, P, 2011–2013
Alex Guerrero, IF/OF, 2014–2015
Pedro Guerrero, IF/OF, 1978–1988
Wilton Guerrero, 2B, 1996–1998
Matt Guerrier, P, 2011–2013
Brad Gulden, C, 1978
Ad Gumbert, P, 1895–1896
Mark Guthrie, P, 1995–1998
Franklin Gutiérrez, OF, 2017
Joel Guzmán, IF, 2006
Chris Gwynn, OF, 1987–1991, 1994–1995
Tony Gwynn Jr., OF, 2011–2012
Jedd Gyorko, IF, 2019

H

Bert Haas, 1B, 1937–1938
George Haddock, P, 1892–1893
Charlie Haeger, P, 2009–2010
Jerry Hairston Jr., IF/OF, 2012–2013
Chip Hale, IF, 1997
John Hale, OF, 1974–1977
Bill Hall, P, 1913
Bob Hall, IF/OF, 1905
Darren Hall, P, 1996–1998
John Hall, P, 1948
Toby Hall, C, 2006
Tom Haller, C, 1968–1971
Bill Hallman, 2B, 1898
Jeff Hamilton, 3B, 1986–1991
Luke Hamlin, P, 1937–1941
Bert Hamric, PH, 1955
Tim Hamulack, P, 2006
Gerry Hannahs, P, 1978–1979
Pat Hannivan, 2B/OF, 1897
Greg Hansell, P, 1995
Dave Hansen, 3B, 1990–1996, 1999–2002
Frank Hansford, P, 1898
Aaron Harang, P, 2012
Dan Haren, P, 2014
Charlie Hargreaves, C, 1923–1928
Mike Harkey, P, 1997
John Harkins, P, 1885–1887
Tim Harkness, 1B, 1961–1962
George Harper, P, 1896
Harry Harper, P, 1923
Bill Harris, P, 1957, 1959
Joe Harris, 1B, 1928
Lenny Harris, IF, 1989–1993
Bill Hart, IF, 1943–1945
Bill Hart, P, 1892
Chris Hartje, C, 1939
Mike Hartley, P, 1989–1991
Buddy Hassett, 1B, 1936–1938
Chris Hatcher, P, 2015–2017
Mickey Hatcher, IF/OF, 1979–1980, 1987–1990
Gil Hatfield, 3B/SS, 1893
Ray Hathaway, P, 1945
Joe Hatten, P, 1946–1951
Chris Haughey, P, 1943
Phil Haugstad, P, 1947–1948, 1951
Brad Havens, P, 1987–1988
Blake Hawksworth, P, 2011
Jackie Hayes, C, 1884–1885
Ray Hayworth, C, 1938–1939, 1944–1945
Ed Head, P, 1940, 1942–1944, 1946
Andrew Heaney, P, 2022
Hughie Hearne, C, 1901–1903
Mike Hechinger, C, 1912–1913
Danny Heep, OF, 1987–1988
Jake Hehl, P, 1918
Fred Heimach, P, 1930–1933
Chris Heisey, OF, 2015
Harry Heitmann, P, 1918
Heath Hembree, P, 2022
George Hemming, P, 1891
Hardie Henderson, P, 1886–1887
Rickey Henderson, OF, 2003
Harvey Hendrick, IF/OF, 1927–1931
Mark Hendrickson, P, 2006–2007
Lafayette Henion, P, 1919
Weldon Henley, P, 1907
Butch Henline, C, 1927–1929
Dutch Henry, P, 1923–1924
Roy Henshaw, P, 1937
Matt Herges, P, 1999–2001
Babe Herman, OF, 1926–1931, 1945
Billy Herman, 2B, 1941–1943, 1946
Chad Hermansen, OF, 2003
Gene Hermanski, OF, 1943, 1946–1951
Carlos Hernández, C, 1990–1996
Kiké Hernández, IF/OF, 2015–2020
Enzo Hernández, SS, 1978
José Hernández, IF, 2004
Ramón Hernández, C, 2013
Roberto Hernández, P, 2007
Roberto Hernández, P, 2014
Elián Herrera, IF/OF, 2012–2013
Art Herring, P, 1934, 1944–1946
Marty Herrmann, P, 1918
Orel Hershiser, P, 1983–1994, 2000
Greg Heydeman, P, 1973
Phil Hiatt, 3B, 2001
Jim Hickman, OF, 1916–1919
Jim Hickman, OF, 1967
Kirby Higbe, P, 1941–1947
Bob Higgins, C, 1911–1912
Andy High, 3B, 1922–1925
George Hildebrand, OF, 1902
Bill Hill, P, 1899
Koyie Hill, C, 2003
Rich Hill, P, 2016–2018
Shawn Hillegas, P, 1987–1988
Shea Hillenbrand, 1B/3B, 2007
Hunkey Hines, OF, 1895
Mike Hines, C, 1885
Don Hoak, 3B, 1954–1955
Oris Hockett, OF, 1938–1939
Gil Hodges, 1B, 1943, 1947–1961
Glenn Hoffman, SS, 1987
Jamie Hoffmann, OF, 2009, 2011
Bert Hogg, 3B, 1934
Bill Holbert, C, 1888
Todd Hollandsworth, OF, 1995–2000
Al Hollingsworth, P, 1939
Bonnie Hollingsworth, P, 1924
Damon Hollins, OF, 1998
Darren Holmes, P, 1990
Jim Holmes, P, 1908
Tommy Holmes, OF, 1952
Brian Holton, P, 1985–1988
Rick Honeycutt, P, 1983–1987
Wally Hood, OF, 1920–1922
Burt Hooton, P, 1975–1984
Gail Hopkins, 1B, 1974
Johnny Hopp, 1B/OF, 1949
Lefty Hopper, P, 1898
Elmer Horton, P, 1898
Ricky Horton, P, 1988–1989
Pete Hotaling, OF, 1885
Charlie Hough, P, 1970–1980
D.J. Houlton, P, 2005, 2007
Charlie Householder, C/1B, 1884
Ed Householder, OF, 1903
Tyler Houston, IF, 2002
Frank Howard, OF, 1958–1964
Thomas Howard, OF, 1998
Steve Howe, P, 1980–1983, 1985
Dixie Howell, C, 1953, 1955–1956
Harry Howell, P, 1898, 1900
Jay Howell, P, 1988–1992
J. P. Howell, P, 2013–2016
Ken Howell, P, 1984–1988
Waite Hoyt, P, 1932, 1937–1938
Chin-Lung Hu, IF, 2007–2010
Trenidad Hubbard, OF, 1998–1999
Bill Hubbell, P, 1925
Daniel Hudson, P, 2018, 2022
Johnny Hudson, IF, 1936–1940
Orlando Hudson, 2B, 2009
Rex Hudson, P, 1974
David Huff, P, 2015
Mike Huff, OF, 1989
Ed Hug, C, 1903
Jay Hughes, P, 1899, 1901–1902
Jim Hughes, P, 1952–1956
Mickey Hughes, P, 1888–1890
Eric Hull, P, 2007
John Hummel, IF/OF, 1905–1915
Al Humphrey, OF, 1911
Todd Hundley, C, 1999–2000, 2003
Bernie Hungling, C, 1922–1923
Ron Hunt, 2B, 1967
George Hunter, P/OF, 1909–1910
Willard Hunter, P, 1962
Jerry Hurley, C, 1907
Joe Hutcheson, OF, 1933
Ira Hutchinson, P, 1939
Roy Hutson, OF, 1925
Tommy Hutton, 1B/OF, 1966, 1969

I

Garey Ingram, IF, 1994–1995, 1997
Bert Inks, P, 1891–1892
Charlie Irwin, 3B, 1901–1902
Kazuhisa Ishii, P, 2002–2004
César Izturis, SS, 2002–2006

J

Fred Jacklitsch, C, 1903–1904
Andre Jackson, P, 2021–2022
Edwin Jackson, P, 2003–2005
Randy Jackson, 3B, 1956–1958
Merwin Jacobson, OF, 1926–1927
Cleo James, OF, 1968
Kenley Jansen, P, 2010–2021
Hal Janvrin, OF, 1921–1922
Roy Jarvis, C, 1944
Stan Javier, OF, 1990–1992
George Jeffcoat, P, 1936–1937, 1939
Jack Jenkins, P, 1969
Hughie Jennings, IF, 1899–1900, 1903
Tommy John, P, 1972–1974, 1976–1978
Brian Johnson, C, 2001
Charles Johnson, C, 1998
Jason Johnson, P, 2008
Jim Johnson, P, 2015
Lou Johnson, OF, 1965–1967
Micah Johnson, IF, 2016
Reed Johnson, OF, 2010
Fred Johnston, IF, 1924
Jimmy Johnston, 3B/OF, 1916–1925
Jay Johnstone, OF, 1980–1982, 1985
Andruw Jones, OF, 2008
Art Jones, P, 1932
Binky Jones, SS, 1924
Charlie Jones, IF, 1884
Fielder Jones, OF, 1896–1900
Mitch Jones, OF, 2009
Nate Jones, P, 2021
Oscar Jones, P, 1903–1905
Brian Jordan, OF, 2002–2003
Dutch Jordan, 2B, 1903–1904
Jimmy Jordan, IF, 1933–1936
Tim Jordan, 1B, 1906–1910
Spider Jorgensen, 3B, 1947–1950
Von Joshua, OF, 1969–1974, 1979
Bill Joyce, 3B, 1892
Mike Judd, P, 1997–2000
Joe Judge, 1B, 1933

K

Tommy Kahnle, P, 2022
Alex Kampouris, 2B, 1941–1943
Eric Karros, 1B, 1991–2002
John Karst, 3B, 1915
Scott Kazmir, P, 2016
Willie Keeler, OF, 1893, 1899–1902
Chet Kehn, P, 1942
Mike Kekich, P, 1965, 1968
John Kelleher, 3B, 1916
Frank Kellert, 1B, 1955
Joe Kelley, OF, 1899–1901
George Kelly, 1B, 1932
Joe Kelly, P, 2019–2021
Roberto Kelly, OF, 1995
Matt Kemp, OF, 2006–2014, 2018
Howie Kendrick, IF/OF, 2015–2016
Adam Kennedy, IF, 2012
Bob Kennedy, 3B/OF, 1957
Brickyard Kennedy, P, 1892–1901
Ed Kennedy, OF, 1886
John Kennedy, IF, 1965–1966
Jeff Kent, 2B, 2005–2008
Maury Kent, P, 1912–1913
Clayton Kershaw, P, 2008–2022
Mike Kickham, P, 2021
Masao Kida, P, 2003–2004
Pete Kilduff, 2B, 1919–1921
Newt Kimball, P, 1940–1943
Sam Kimber, P, 1884
Craig Kimbrel, P, 2022
Clyde King, P, 1944–1945, 1947–1948, 1951–1952
Mike Kinkade, IF/OF, 2002–2003
Tom Kinslow, C, 1891–1894
Fred Kipp, P, 1957
Wayne Kirby, OF, 1996–1997
Enos Kirkpatrick, 3B, 1912–1913
Frank Kitson, P, 1900–1902
Johnny Klippstein, P, 1958–1959
Joe Klugmann, 2B, 1924
Elmer Klumpp, C, 1937
Corey Knebel, P, 2021
Elmer Knetzer, P, 1909–1912
Hub Knolls, P, 1906
Jimmy Knowles, IF, 1884
Barney Koch, 2B, 1944
Len Koenecke, OF, 1934–1935
Adam Kolarek, P, 2019–2020
Paul Konerko, 1B, 1997–1998
Ed Konetchy, 1B, 1919–1921
Jim Korwan, P, 1894
Andy Kosco, OF, 1969–1970
Sandy Koufax, P, 1955–1966
Joe Koukalik, P, 1904
Lou Koupal, P, 1928–1929
Ernie Koy, OF, 1938–1940
Chuck Kress, 1B, 1954
Chad Kreuter, C, 2000–2002
Bill Krieg, C/1B/OF, 1885
Bill Krueger, P, 1987–1988
Ernie Krueger, C, 1917–1921
Abe Kruger, P, 1908
Jeff Kubenka, P, 1998–1999
Hong-Chih Kuo, P, 2005–2011
Hiroki Kuroda, P, 2008–2011
Jul Kustus, OF, 1909

L

Clem Labine, P, 1950–1960
Candy LaChance, 1B, 1893–1898
Lee Lacy, OF, 1972–1978
Lerrin LaGrow, P, 1979
Frank Lamanske, P, 1935
Bill Lamar, OF, 1920–1921
Jake Lamb, OF, 2022
Wayne LaMaster, P, 1938
Ray Lamb, P, 1969–1970
Rafael Landestoy, 2B, 1977, 1983–1984
Ken Landreaux, OF, 1981–1987
Joe Landrum, P, 1950–1952
Tito Landrum, OF, 1987
Frank Lankford, P, 1998
Norm Larker, 1B, 1958–1961
Andy LaRoche, 3B, 2007–2008
Lyn Lary, SS, 1939
Tommy Lasorda, P, 1954–1955
Tacks Latimer, C, 1902
Mat Latos, P, 2015
Cookie Lavagetto, IF, 1937–1941, 1946–1947
Rudy Law, OF, 1978, 1980
Tony Lazzeri, 2B, 1939
Brent Leach, P. 2009
Brandon League, P, 2012–2014
Bill Leard, 2B, 1917
Tim Leary, P, 1987–1989
Ricky Ledée, OF, 2005–2006
Bob Lee, P, 1967
Hal Lee, OF, 1930
Leron Lee, OF, 1975–1976
Zach Lee, P, 2015
Jim Lefebvre, 2B, 1965–1972
Ken Lehman, P, 1952, 1956–1957
Larry LeJeune, OF, 1911
Don LeJohn, 3B, 1965
Steve Lembo, C, 1950, 1952
Ed Lennox, 3B, 1909–1910
Dutch Leonard, P, 1933–1936
Jeffrey Leonard, OF, 1977
Sam Leslie, 1B, 1933–1935
Dennis Lewallyn, P, 1975–1979
Darren Lewis, OF, 1997
Phil Lewis, SS, 1905–1908
Jim Leyritz, C/1B, 2000
Adam Liberatore, P, 2015–2018
Mike Lieberthal, C, 2007
Bob Lillis, SS, 1958–1961
Ted Lilly, P, 2010–2013
José Lima, P, 2004
Josh Lindblom, P, 2011–2012
Jim Lindsey, P, 1937
John Lindsey, 1B, 2010
Freddie Lindstrom, 3B/OF, 1936
Jon Link, P, 2010
Nelson Liriano, 2B, 1997
Mickey Livingston, C, 1951
Paul Lo Duca, C, 1998–2004
Esteban Loaiza, P, 2007–2008
Tim Locastro, OF, 2017–2018
Billy Loes, P, 1950, 1952–1956
Kenny Lofton, OF, 2006
Dick Loftus, OF, 1924–1925
Bob Logan, P, 1935
Bill Lohrman, P, 1943–1944
Ernie Lombardi, C, 1931
Vic Lombardi, P, 1945–1947
James Loney, 1B, 2006–2012
Tom Long, P, 1924
Davey Lopes, 2B, 1972–1981
Al López, C, 1928–1935
Luis López, C, 1990
Mark Loretta, IF, 2009
Charlie Loudenslager, 2B, 1904
Tom Lovett, P, 1889–1891, 1893
Derek Lowe, P, 2005–2008
Ray Lucas, P, 1933–1934
Con Lucid, P, 1894–1895
Julio Lugo, SS, 2006
Matt Luke, OF, 1998
Harry Lumley, OF, 1904–1910
Don Lund, OF, 1945, 1947–1948
Dolf Luque, P, 1930–1931
Gavin Lux, IF/OF, 2019–2022
Barry Lyons, C, 1990–1991
Jim Lyttle, OF, 1976

M

Mike MacDougal, P, 2011–2012
Ed MacGamwell, 1B, 1905
Manny Machado, IF, 2018
Max Macon, P, 1940, 1942–1943
Greg Maddux, P, 2006, 2008
Mike Maddux, P, 1990, 1999
Bill Madlock, 3B, 1985–1987
Ryan Madson, P, 2018
Kenta Maeda, P, 2016–2019
Lee Magee, 2B/OF, 1919
Matt Magill, P, 2013
Sal Maglie, P, 1956–1957
George Magoon, IF, 1898
Paul Maholm, P, 2014
Duster Mails, P, 1915–1916
Charlie Malay, 2B, 1905
Candy Maldonado, OF, 1981–1985
Tony Malinosky, IF, 1937
Mal Mallette, P, 1950
Lew Malone, IF, 1917, 1919
Billy Maloney, OF, 1906–1908
Sean Maloney, P, 1998
Al Mamaux, P, 1918–1923
Gus Mancuso, C, 1940
Charlie Manuel, OF, 1974–1975
Heinie Manush, OF, 1937–1938
Rabbit Maranville, IF, 1926
Juan Marichal, P, 1975
Rube Marquard, P, 1915–1920
Carlos Mármol, P, 2013
Oreste Marrero, 1B, 1996
William Marriott, 3B, 1926–1927
Buck Marrow, P, 1937–1938
Doc Marshall, C, 1909
Mike Marshall, 1B/OF, 1981–1989
Mike Marshall, P, 1974–1976
Chris Martin, P, 2022
Morrie Martin, P, 1949
Russell Martin, C,  2006–2010, 2019
Tom Martin, P, 2003–2004
Pedro Martínez, P, 1992–1993
Ramón Martínez, IF, 2006–2007
Ramón Martínez, P, 1988–1998
Ted Martínez, SS, 1977–1979
Onan Masaoka, P, 1999–2000
Earl Mattingly, P, 1931
Len Matuszek, 1B, 1985–1987
Gene Mauch, 2B, 1944, 1948
Al Maul, P, 1899
Ralph Mauriello, P, 1958
Carmen Mauro, OF, 1953
Dustin May, P, 2019–2022
Brent Mayne, C, 2004
Al Mays, P, 1888
Luis Maza, IF, 2008
Al McBean, P, 1969–1970
Bill McCabe, IF/OF, 1920
Gene McCann, P, 1901–1902
Bill McCarren, 3B, 1923
Brandon McCarthy, P, 2015–2017
Jack McCarthy, OF, 1906–1907
Johhny McCarthy, 1B, 1934–1935
Tommy McCarthy, OF, 1896
Lew McCarty, C, 1913–1916
Jim McCauley, C, 1886
Bill McClellan, IF, 1885–1888
Mike McCormick, 3B, 1904
Mike McCormick, OF, 1949
Walt McCredie, OF, 1903
Tom McCreery, OF, 1901–1903
Terry McDermott, 1B, 1972
Danny McDevitt, P, 1957–1960
James McDonald, P, 2008–2010
Sandy McDougal, P, 1895
Roger McDowell, P, 1991–1994
Pryor McElveen, 3B, 1909–1911
Dan McFarlan, P, 1899
Chappie McFarland, P, 1906
Dan McGann, 1B, 1899
 Jake McGee, P, 2020
Joe McGinnity, P, 1900
Pat McGlothin, P, 1949–1950
Bob McGraw, P, 1925–1927
Fred McGriff, 1B, 2003
Deacon McGuire, C, 1899–1901
Harry McIntire, P, 1905–1909
Doc McJames, P, 1899, 1901
Kit McKenna, P, 1898
Billy McKinney, OF, 2021
Zach McKinstry, IF/OF, 2020–2022
Ed McLane, OF, 1907
Cal McLish, P, 1944, 1946
Sadie McMahon, P, 1897
John McMakin, P, 1902
Frank McManus, C, 1903
Greg McMichael, P, 1998
Tommy McMillan, SS, 1908–1910
Ken McMullen, 3B, 1962–1964, 1973–1975
Jim McTamany, OF, 1885–1887
George McVey, C/1B, 1885
Doug McWeeny, P, 1926–1929
Joe Medwick, OF, 1940–1943, 1946
Adam Melhuse, C, 2000
Jonathan Meloan, P, 2007
Rube Melton, P, 1943–1944, 1946–1947
Orlando Mercado, C, 1987
Fred Merkle, 1B, 1916–1917
Andy Messersmith, P, 1973–1975, 1979
Mike Metcalfe, IF/OF, 1998, 2000
Irish Meusel, OF, 1927
Benny Meyer, OF, 1913
Leo Meyer, SS, 1909
Russ Meyer, P, 1953–1955
Chief Meyers, C, 1916–1917
Gene Michael, SS, 1967
Glenn Mickens, P, 1953
Doug Mientkiewicz, IF, 2009
Pete Mikkelsen, P, 1969–1972
Eddie Miksis, 2B/OF, 1944, 1946–1951
Aaron Miles, IF, 2011
Don Miles, OF, 1958
Johnny Miljus, P, 1917, 1920–1921
Bob Miller, P, 1963–1967
Fred Miller, P, 1910
Hack Miller, OF, 1916
John Miller, 1B/OF, 1969
Justin Miller, P, 2010
Larry Miller, P, 1964
Lemmie Miller, OF, 1984
Otto Miller, C, 1910–1922
Ralph Miller, P, 1898
Rod Miller, PH, 1957
Trever Miller, P, 2000
Walt Miller, P, 1911
Wally Millies, C, 1934
Bob Milliken, P, 1953–1954
Alan Mills, P, 1999–2000
Buster Mills, OF, 1935
Eric Milton, P, 2009
Paul Minner, P, 1946, 1948–1949
Bobby Mitchell, OF, 1980–1981
Clarence Mitchell, P, 1918–1922
Dale Mitchell, OF, 1956
Fred Mitchell, P, 1904–1905
Johnny Mitchell, SS, 1924–1925
Russ Mitchell, IF, 2010–2011
Dave Mlicki, P, 1998–1999
Chad Moeller, C, 2007
Joe Moeller, P, 1962, 1964, 1966–1971
George Mohart, P, 1920–1921
Carlos Monasterios, P, 2010
Rick Monday, OF, 1977–1984
Raúl Mondesí, OF, 1993–1999
Wally Moon, OF, 1959–1965
Cy Moore, P, 1929–1932
Dee Moore, C, 1943
Eddie Moore, 2B, 1929–1930
Gary Moore, OF, 1970
Gene Moore, OF, 1939–1940
Randy Moore, OF, 1936–1937
Ray Moore, P, 1952–1953
José Morales, 1B, 1982–1984
Herbie Moran, OF, 1912–1913
Bobby Morgan, IF, 1950, 1952–1953
Eddie Morgan, 1B/OF, 1937
Mike Morgan, P, 1989–1991
Reyes Moronta, P, 2022
Johnny Morrison, P, 1929–1930
Brandon Morrow, P, 2017
Walt Moryn, OF, 1954–1955
Ray Moss, P, 1926–1931
Earl Mossor, P, 1951
Guillermo Mota, P, 2002–2004, 2009
Manny Mota, OF, 1969–1980, 1982
Glen Moulder, P, 1946
Ray Mowe, SS, 1913
Mike Mowrey, 3B, 1916–1917
Peter Moylan, P, 2013
Bill Mueller, 3B, 2006
Terry Mulholland, P, 2001–2002
Billy Mullen, 3B, 1923
Scott Mullen, P, 2003
Joe Mulvey, 3B, 1895
Max Muncy, IF, 2018–2022
Van Mungo, P, 1931–1941
Les Munns, P, 1934–1935
Mike Muñoz, P, 1989–1990
Noe Muñoz, C, 1995
Simmy Murch, IF, 1908
Rob Murphy, P, 1995
Eddie Murray, 1B, 1989–1991, 1997
Jim Murray, P, 1922
Hy Myers, OF, 1909, 1911, 1914–1922
Rodney Myers, P, 2003–2004
Brian Myrow, 1B, 2005

N

Sam Nahem, P, 1938
Norihiro Nakamura, 3B, 2005
Dioner Navarro, C, 2005–2006, 2011
Earl Naylor, OF, 1946
Charlie Neal, 2B, 1956–1961
Zach Neal, P, 2018
Ron Negray, P, 1952, 1958
Kristopher Negrón, IF/OF, 2019
Jim Neidlinger, P, 1990
Bernie Neis, OF, 1920–1924
Jimmy Nelson, P, 2021
Rocky Nelson, 1B, 1952, 1956
Dick Nen, 1B, 1963
Sheldon Neuse, IF, 2021
Don Newcombe, P, 1949–1951, 1954–1958
Bobo Newsom, P, 1929–1930, 1942–1943
Doc Newton, P, 1901–1902
Juan Nicasio, P, 2015
Rod Nichols, P, 1993
Tom Niedenfuer, P, 1981–1987
Otho Nitcholas, P, 1945
Al Nixon, OF, 1915–1916, 1918
Otis Nixon, OF, 1997
Ricky Nolasco, P, 2013
Hideo Nomo, P, 1995–1998, 2002–2004
Jerry Nops, P, 1900
Irv Noren, OF, 1960
Fred Norman, P, 1970
Bud Norris, P, 2016
Billy North, OF, 1978
Hub Northen, OF, 1911–1912
Darien Núñez, P, 2021
José Antonio Núñez, P, 2001

O

Bob O'Brien, P, 1971
Darby O'Brien, OF, 1888–1892
Jack O'Brien, C/1B, 1887
John O'Brien, 2B, 1891
Lefty O'Doul, OF, 1931–1933
Ollie O'Mara, SS, 1914–1919
Mickey O'Neil, C, 1926
Frank O'Rourke, 3B, 1917–1918
Johnny Oates, C, 1977–1979
Whitey Ock, C, 1935
Trent Oeltjen, OF, 2010–2011
Joe Oeschger, P, 1925
José Offerman, SS, 1990–1995
Will Ohman, P, 2009
Bob Ojeda, P, 1991–1992
Dave Oldfield, C/OF, 1885–1886
Al Oliver, OF, 1985
Nate Oliver, 2B, 1963–1967
Miguel Olivo, C, 2014
Luis Rodríguez Olmo, OF, 1943–1945, 1949
Gregg Olson, P, 2000–2001
Ivy Olson, SS, 1915–1924
Ralph Onis, C, 1935
Joe Orengo, IF, 1943
Jesse Orosco, P, 1988, 2001–2002
Dave Orr, 1B, 1888
Jorge Orta, OF, 1982
Phil Ortega, P, 1960–1964
Ramón Ortiz, P, 2010
Russ Ortiz, P, 2010
Tiny Osborne, P, 1924–1925
Charlie Osgood, P, 1944
Franquelis Osoria, P, 2005–2006
Claude Osteen, P, 1965–1973
Fritz Ostermueller, P, 1943–1944
Al Osuna, P, 1994
Antonio Osuna, P, 1995–2000
Billy Otterson, SS, 1887
Chink Outen, C, 1933
James Outman, OF, 2022
Mickey Owen, C, 1941–1945
Red Owens, 2B, 1905
Pablo Ozuna, IF, 2008

P

Tom Paciorek, OF, 1970–1975
Don Padgett, C, 1946
Vicente Padilla, P, 2009–2011
Andy Pafko OF, 1951–1952
Phil Page, P, 1934
Erv Palica, P, 1945, 1947–1951, 1953–1954
Ed Palmquist, P, 1960–1961
Edward Paredes, P, 2017–2018
Chan-ho Park, P, 1994–2001, 2008
Rick Parker, OF, 1995–1996
Wes Parker, 1B, 1964–1972
Art Parks, OF, 1937, 1939
José Parra, P, 1995
Jay Partridge, 2B, 1927–1928
Camilo Pascual, P, 1970
Kevin Pasley, C, 1974, 1976–1977
Jim Pastorius, P, 1906–1909
Harry Pattee, 2B, 1908
Dave Patterson, P, 1979
Red Patterson, P, 2014
Jimmy Pattison, P, 1929
Xavier Paul, OF, 2009–2011
Harley Payne, P, 1896–1898
Johnny Peacock, C, 1945
Hal Peck, OF, 1943
Joc Pederson, OF, 2014–2020
Stu Pederson, OF, 1985
Alejandro Peña, P, 1981–1989
Ángel Peña, C, 1998–1999, 2001
José Peña, P, 1970–1972
Brad Penny, P, 2004–2008
Jimmy Peoples, C/SS, 1885–1888
Ryan Pepiot, P, 2022
Joel Peralta, P, 2015
José Peraza, IF/OF, 2015
Jack Perconte, 2B, 1980–1981
Antonio Pérez, IF, 2004–2005
Carlos Pérez, P, 1998–2000
Chris Perez, P, 2014
Odalis Pérez, P, 2002–2006
Charlie Perkins, P, 1934
Ron Perranoski, P, 1961–1967, 1972
Pat Perry, P, 1990
DJ Peters, OF, 2021
JIm Peterson, P, 1937
Jesse Petty, P, 1925–1928
Jeff Pfeffer, P, 1913–1921
George Pfister, C, 1941
Lee Pfund, P, 1945
Babe Phelps, C, 1935–1941
Ed Phelps, C, 1912–1913
Ray Phelps, P, 1930–1932
Bill Phillips, 1B, 1885–1887
Evan Phillips, P, 2021–2022
Jason Phillips, C, 2005
Mike Piazza, C, 1992–1998
Val Picinich, C, 1929–1933
Juan Pierre, OF, 2007–2009
Joe Pignatano, C, 1957–1960
Kevin Pillar, OF, 2022
George Pinkney, 3B, 1885–1891
Ed Pipgras, P, 1932
Norman Plitt, P, 1918, 1927
Bud Podbielan, P, 1949–1952
Johnny Podres, P, 1953–1966
Scott Podsednik, OF, 2010
Boots Poffenberger, P, 1939
A. J. Pollock, OF, 2019–2021
Nick Polly, 3B, 1937
Ed Poole, P, 1904
Jim Poole, P, 1990
Paul Popovich, 2B, 1968–1969
Henry Porter, P, 1885–1887
Bill Posedel, P, 1938
Sam Post, 1B, 1922
Dykes Potter, P, 1938
Bill Pounds, P, 1903
Boog Powell, 1B, 1977
Dennis Powell, P, 1985–1986
Paul Powell, C, 1973, 1975
Scott Proctor, P, 2007–2008
Ted Power, P, 1981–1982
Tot Pressnell, P, 1938–1940
David Price, P, 2021–2022
Tom Prince, C, 1994–1998
Luke Prokopec, P, 2000–2001
Yasiel Puig, OF, 2013–2018
Albert Pujols, 1B, 2021
Nick Punto, IF, 2012–2013
John Purdin, P, 1964–1965, 1968–1969
Eddie Pye, IF, 1994–1995

Q

Kevin Quackenbush, P, 2021
Paul Quantrill, P, 2002–2003
Jack Quinn, P, 1931–1932

R

Steve Rachunok, P, 1940
Marv Rackley, OF, 1947–1949
Paul Radford, OF, 1888
Scott Radinsky, P, 1996–1998
Jack Radtke, 2B, 1936
Pat Ragan, P, 1911–1915
Ed Rakow, P, 1960
Luke Raley, OF, 2021
Bob Ramazzotti, IF, 1946, 1948–1949
Hanley Ramírez, IF, 2012–2014
Manny Ramirez, OF, 2008–2010
Yefry Ramírez, P, 2021
Willie Ramsdell, P, 1947–1950
Mike Ramsey, OF, 1987
Mike Ramsey, IF, 1985
Willie Randolph, 2B, 1989–1990
Gary Rath, P, 1998
Doug Rau, P, 1972–1979
Lance Rautzhan, P, 1977–1979
Josh Ravin, P, 2015–2017
Phil Reardon, OF, 1906
Jeff Reboulet, IF, 2001–2002
Josh Reddick, OF, 2016
Harry Redmond, 2B, 1909
Howie Reed, P, 1964–1966
Jake Reed, P, 2021–2022
Jody Reed, 2B, 1993
Pee Wee Reese, SS, 1940–1942, 1946–1958
Phil Regan, P, 1966–1968
Bill Reidy, P, 1899, 1903–1904
Bobby Reis, P/OF, 1931–1932, 1935
Pete Reiser, OF, 1940–1942, 1946–1948
Doc Reisling, P, 1904–1905
Zach Reks, OF, 2021
Jack Remsen, OF, 1884
Jason Repko, OF, 2005–2006, 2008–2009
Rip Repulski, OF, 1959–1960
Ed Reulbach, P, 1913–1914
Jerry Reuss, P, 1979–1987
Al Reyes, P, 2000–2001
Dennys Reyes, P, 1997–1998
Gilberto Reyes, C, 1983–1985, 1987–1988
Charlie Reynolds, C, 1889
R. J. Reynolds, OF, 1983–1985
Billy Rhiel, IF, 1929
Rick Rhoden, P, 1974–1978
Paul Richards, C, 1932
Danny Richardson, IF, 1893
Pete Richert, P, 1962–1964, 1972–1973
Harry Riconda, 3B, 1928
Joe Riggert, OF, 1914
Adam Riggs, IF, 1997
Lew Riggs, 3B, 1941–1942, 1946
Edwin Ríos, 1B, 2019–2022
Jimmy Ripple, OF, 1939–1940
Lew Ritter, C, 1902–1908
Germán Rivera, 3B, 1983–1984
Juan Rivera, OF, 2011–2012
Johnny Rizzo, OF, 1942
Dave Roberts, OF, 2002–2004
Jim Roberts, P, 1924–1925
Dick Robertson, P, 1918
Charlie Robinson, C, 1885
Clint Robinson, 1B, 2014
Earl Robinson, OF, 1958
Frank Robinson, OF, 1972
Jackie Robinson, 2B, 1947–1956
Óscar Robles, IF, 2005–2006
Sergio Robles, C, 1976
Lou Rochelli, 2B, 1944
Rich Rodas, P, 1983–1984
Ellie Rodríguez, C, 1976
Félix Rodríguez, P, 1995
Henry Rodríguez, OF, 1992–1995
Paco Rodriguez, P, 2012–2015
Preacher Roe, P, 1948–1954
Ed Roebuck, P, 1955–1963
Ron Roenicke, OF, 1981–1983
Oscar Roettger, P, 1927
Lee Rogers, P, 1938
Packy Rogers, IF, 1938
Mel Rojas, P, 1999
Miguel Rojas, IF, 2014
Stan Rojek, SS, 1942, 1946–1947
Jimmy Rollins, SS, 2015
Jamie Romak, IF/OF, 2014
Jason Romano, IF/OF, 2003
Jim Romano, P, 1950
Sergio Romo, P, 2017
Vicente Romo, P, 1968, 1982
Mike Rose, C, 2005
Johnny Roseboro, C, 1957–1967
Chief Roseman, OF, 1887
Goody Rosen, OF, 1937–1939, 1944–1946
Max Rosenfeld, OF, 1931–1933
Cody Ross, OF, 2005–2006
Dave Ross, C, 2002–2004
Don Ross, 3B, 1940
Zac Rosscup, P, 2018–2019
Ken Rowe, P, 1963
Schoolboy Rowe, P, 1942
JeanPierre Roy, P, 1946
Luther Roy, P, 1929
Jerry Royster, 3B, 1973–1975
Wilkin Ruan, OF, 2002–2003
Nap Rucker, P, 1907–1916
Ernie Rudolph, P, 1945
Dutch Ruether, P, 1921–1924
Justin Ruggiano, OF, 2015
Carlos Ruiz, C, 2016
Keibert Ruiz, C, 2020–2021
Andy Rush, P, 1925
Bill Russell, SS, 1969–1986
Jim Russell, OF, 1950–1951
John Russell, P, 1917–1918
Johnny Rutherford, P, 1952
Jack Ryan, C, 1898
Jack Ryan, P, 1911
Rosy Ryan, P, 1933
Hyun-jin Ryu, P, 2013–2014, 2016–2019

S

Casey Sadler, P, 2019
Olmedo Sáenz, 1B 2004–2007
Takashi Saito, P, 2006–2008
Juan Samuel, 2B, 1990–1992
Duaner Sánchez, P, 2004–2005
Mike Sandlock, C, 1945–1946
Jerry Sands, 1B/OF, 2011–2012
Chance Sanford, IF, 1999
Dennis Santana, P, 2018–2021
F. P. Santangelo, OF, 2000
Sergio Santos, P, 2015
Jack Savage, P, 1987
Ted Savage, OF, 1968
Dave Sax, C, 1982–1983
Steve Sax, 2B, 1981–1988
Bill Sayles, P, 1943
Josh Sborz, P, 2019–2020
Doc Scanlan, P, 1904–1907, 1909–1911
Bill Schardt, P, 1911–1912
Scott Schebler, OF, 2015
Al Scheer, OF, 1913
Bill Schenck, IF, 1885
Max Scherzer, P, 2021
Travis Schlichting, P, 2009–2010
Dutch Schliebner, 1B, 1923
Ray Schmandt, 1B, 1918–1922
Henry Schmidt, P, 1903
Jason Schmidt, P, 2007, 2009
Johnny Schmitz, P, 1951–1952
Steve Schmoll, P, 2005
Charlie Schmutz, P, 1914–1915
Frank Schneiberg, P, 1910
Dick Schofield (Jr), SS, 1995
Dick Schofield (Sr), SS, 1966–1967
Gene Schott, P, 1939
Paul Schreiber, P, 1922–1923
Pop Schriver, C, 1886
Howie Schultz, 1B, 1943–1947
Jaime Schultz, P, 2019
Joe Schultz, OF, 1915
Skip Schumaker, 2B/OF, 2013
Ferdie Schupp, P, 1921
Mike Scioscia, C, 1980–1992
Dick Scott, P, 1963
Corey Seager, SS, 2015–2021
Rudy Seánez, P, 1994–1995, 2007
Ray Searage, P, 1989–1990
Tom Seats, P, 1945
Jimmy Sebring, OF, 1909
Larry See, 1B, 1986
Rob Segedin, IF/OF, 2016–2017
Aaron Sele, P, 2006
Justin Sellers, IF, 2011–2013
Dave Sells, P, 1975
Jae Weong Seo, P, 2006
Elmer Sexauer, P, 1948
Greg Shanahan, P, 1973–1974
Mike Sharperson, IF/OF, 1987–1993
George Sharrott, P, 1893–1894
Joe Shaute, P, 1931–1933
Jeff Shaw, P, 1998–2001
Merv Shea, C, 1938
Jimmy Sheckard, OF, 1897–1898, 1900–1905
Jack Sheehan, IF, 1920–1921
Tommy Sheehan, 3B, 1908
Gary Sheffield, OF, 1998–2001
John Shelby, OF, 1987–1990
Jimmie Sherfy, P, 2021
Red Sheridan, IF, 1918, 1920
Vince Sherlock, 2B, 1935
George Sherrill, P, 2009–2010
Larry Sherry, P, 1958–1963
Norm Sherry, C, 1959–1962
Billy Shindle, 3B, 1894–1898
Craig Shipley, 3B, 1986–1987
Bart Shirley, IF, 1964, 1966, 1968
Steve Shirley, P, 1982
George Shoch, IF/OF, 1893–1897
Harry Shriver, P, 1922–1923
George Shuba, OF, 1948–1955
Paul Shuey, P, 2002–2003
Dick Siebert, 1B, 1932, 1936
Ed Silch, OF, 1888
Joe Simpson, OF, 1975–1978
Duke Sims, C, 1971–1972
Bill Singer, P, 1964–1972
Fred Sington, OF, 1938–1939
Ted Sizemore, 2B, 1969–1970, 1976
Frank Skaff, 1B, 1935
Bill Skowron, 1B, 1963
Gordon Slade, SS, 1930–1932
Lefty Sloat, P, 1948
Aleck Smith, C, 1897–1900
Charley Smith, 3B, 1960–1961
Dick Smith, 1B/OF, 1965
George Smith, P, 1918, 1923
Germany Smith, SS, 1885–1890, 1897
Greg Smith, IF, 1991
Happy Smith, OF, 1910
Jack Smith, P, 1962–1963
Phenomenal Smith, P, 1885
Red Smith, 3B, 1911–1914
Reggie Smith, OF, 1976–1981
Sherry Smith, P, 1915–1917, 1919–1922
Tony Smith, SS, 1910–1911
Will Smith, C, 2019–2022
Clancy Smyres, SS, 1944
Red Smyth, OF, 1915–1917
Harry Smythe, P, 1934
Duke Snider, OF, 1947–1962
Cory Snyder, OF, 1993–1994
Gene Snyder, P, 1959
Jack Snyder, C, 1917
Eddie Solomon, P, 1973–1974
Andy Sommerville, P, 1894
Elías Sosa, P, 1976–1977
Denny Sothern, OF, 1931
Steven Souza Jr., OF, 2021
Daryl Spencer, SS, 1961–1963
Roy Spencer, C, 1937–1938
Karl Spooner, P, 1954–1955
Dennis Springer, P, 2001–2002
Eddie Stack, P, 1912–1913
Tuck Stainback, OF, 1938–1939
George Stallings, C, 1890
Jerry Standaert, IF, 1925–1926
Don Stanhouse, P, 1980
Eddie Stanky, 2B, 1944–1947
Dolly Stark, SS, 1910–1912
Jigger Statz, OF, 1927–1928
Bill Steele, P, 1914
Elmer Steele, P, 1911
Farmer Steelman, C, 1900–1901
Ed Stein, P, 1892–1898
Casey Stengel, OF, 1912–1917
Jerry Stephenson, P, 1970
Ed Stevens, 1B, 1945–1947
Brock Stewart, P, 2016–2019
Dave Stewart, P, 1978, 1981–1983
Scott Stewart, P, 2004
Stuffy Stewart, 2B, 1923
Bob Stinson, C, 1969–1970
Milt Stock, 3B, 1924–1926
Harry Stovey, OF, 1893
Mike Strahler, P, 1970–1972
Sammy Strang, IF, 1903–1904
Joe Strauss, OF, 1886
Darryl Strawberry, OF, 1991–1993
Elmer Stricklett, P, 1905–1907
Ross Stripling, P, 2016–2020
Joe Stripp, 3B, 1932–1937
Dutch Stryker, P, 1926
Dick Stuart, 1B, 1966
Franklin Stubbs, 1B/OF, 1984–1989
Eric Stults, P, 2006–2009
Tanyon Sturtze, P, 2008
Bill Sudakis, 3B, 1968–1971
Clyde Sukeforth, C, 1932–1934, 1945
Billy Sullivan Jr., C, 1942
Tom Sunkel, P, 1944
Eric Surkamp, P, 2015
Rick Sutcliffe, P, 1976, 1978–1981
Don Sutton, P, 1966–1980, 1988
Ed Swartwood, 1B/OF, 1885–1887
Mark Sweeney, 1B, 2007–2008
Bill Swift, P, 1941

T

Vito Tamulis, P, 1938–1941
Kevin Tapani, P, 1995
Jack Taschner, P, 2010
Tommy Tatum, OF, 1941, 1947
Alex Taveras, IF, 1982–1983
Chris Taylor, IF/OF, 2016–2022
Danny Taylor, OF, 1932–1936
Harry Taylor, P, 1946–1948
Zack Taylor, C, 1935
Dick Teed, C, 1953
Chuck Templeton, P, 1955–1956
Nick Tepesch, P, 2016
Joe Tepsic, OF, 1946
Ryan Theriot, 2B, 2010
Adonis Terry, P/OF, 1884–1891
Wayne Terwilliger, 2B, 1951
Marcus Thames, OF, 2011
Grant Thatcher, P, 1903–1904
Henry Thielman, P, 1903
Derrel Thomas, 2B/OF, 1979–1983
Fay Thomas, P, 1932
Ian Thomas, P, 2015
Ray Thomas, C, 1938
Gary Thomasson, OF, 1979–1980
Jim Thome, PH, 2009
Derek Thompson, P, 2005
Don Thompson, OF, 1951, 1953–1954
Fresco Thompson, 2B, 1931–1932
Milt Thompson, OF, 1996
Tim Thompson, C, 1954
Trayce Thompson, OF, 2016–2017, 2022
Hank Thormahlen, P, 1925
Joe Thurston, IF, 2002–2004
Sloppy Thurston, P, 1930–1933
Cotton Tierney, 2B, 1925
Terry Tiffee, IF/OF, 2008
Al Todd, C, 1939
Andrew Toles, OF, 2016–2018
Shawn Tolleson, P, 2012–2013
Brett Tomko, P, 2006–2007
Steve Toole, P, 1886–1887
Bert Tooley, SS, 1911–1912
Jeff Torborg, C, 1964–1970
Ronald Torreyes, IF, 2015
Dick Tracewski, IF, 1962–1965
Brian Traxler, 1B, 1990
George Treadway, OF, 1894–1895
Jeff Treadway, 2B, 1994–1995
Matt Treanor, C, 2012
Blake Treinen, P, 2020–2022
Nick Tremark, OF, 1934–1936
Overton Tremper, OF, 1927–1928
Alex Treviño, C, 1986–1987
Carlos Triunfel, IF, 2014
Ricky Trlicek, P, 1993
Mike Trombley, P, 2001
Ramón Troncoso, P, 2008–2011
Chin-hui Tsao, P, 2007, 2015–2016
Yoshi Tsutsugo, OF, 2021
Tommy Tucker, 1B, 1898
John Tudor, P, 1988–1989
Justin Turner, IF, 2014–2022
Trea Turner, IF, 2021–2022
Ty Tyson, OF, 1928

U

Edwin Uceta, P, 2021
Fred Underwood, P, 1894
Julio Urías, P, 2016–2022
Juan Uribe, IF, 2011–2015
Chase Utley, IF, 2015–2018

V

Mike Vail, OF, 1984
Ismael Valdez, P, 1994–2000
René Valdez, P, 1957
Wilson Valdez, IF, 2007
José Valentín, 3B, 2005
Bobby Valentine, IF, 1969, 1971–1972
Fernando Valenzuela, P, 1980–1990
Breyvic Valera, IF/OF, 2018
Héctor Valle, C, 1965
Elmer Valo, OF, 1957–1958
Deacon Van Buren, OF, 1904
Chris Van Cuyk, P, 1950–1952
Johnny Van Cuyk, P, 1947–1949
Scott Van Slyke, 1B/OF, 2012–2017
Dazzy Vance, P, 1922–1932, 1935
Sandy Vance, P, 1970–1971
Ed Vande Berg, P, 1986
Claudio Vargas, P, 2009
Miguel Vargas, IF, 2022
Andrew Vasquez, P, 2021
Arky Vaughan, SS, 1942–1943, 1947–1948
Eugenio Vélez, IF/OF, 2011
Will Venable, OF, 2016
Mike Venafro, P, 2004
Pat Venditte, P, 2018
Robin Ventura, 3B, 2003–2004
Alex Verdugo, OF, 2017–2019
Alex Vesia, P, 2021–2022
Zoilo Versalles, SS, 1968
Rube Vickers, P, 1903
Shane Victorino, OF, 2012
Joe Visner, C/OF, 1889
José Vizcaíno, IF, 1989–1990, 1998–2000
Edinson Vólquez, P, 2013
Joe Vosmik, OF, 1940–1941

W

Paul Wachtel, P, 1917
Ben Wade, P, 1952–1954
Cory Wade, P, 2008–2009
Bull Wagner, P, 1913–1914
Butts Wagner, 3B, 1898
Dixie Walker, OF, 1939–1947
Mysterious Walker, P, 1913
Oscar Walker, 1B/OF, 1884
Rube Walker, C, 1951–1958
Joe Wall, C, 1902
Josh Wall, P, 2012–2013
Stan Wall, P, 1975–1977
Tim Wallach, 3B, 1993–1996
Lee Walls, OF, 1962–1964
Dave Walsh, P, 1990
Zach Walters, OF, 2016
Danny Walton, OF, 1976
Lloyd Waner, OF, 1944
Paul Waner, OF, 1943–1944
Chuck Ward, SS, 1918–1922
Daryle Ward, OF, 2003
John Ward, IF, 1891–1892
Preston Ward, 1B, 1948
Rube Ward, OF, 1902
Fred Warner, 3B, 1884
Jack Warner, 3B, 1929–1931
Tommy Warren, P, 1944
Carl Warwick, OF, 1961
Jimmy Wasdell, OF, 1940–1941
Ron Washington, SS, 1977
George Watkins, OF, 1936
Tony Watson, P, 2017
Gary Wayne, P, 1994
Eric Weaver, P, 1998
Jeff Weaver, P, 2004–2005, 2009
Hank Webb, P, 1977
Les Webber, P, 1942–1946
Mitch Webster, OF, 1991–1995
Gary Weiss, SS, 1980–1981
Bob Welch, P, 1978–1987
Brad Wellman, 2B, 1987
David Wells, P, 2007
John Wells, P, 1944
Terry Wells, P, 1990
Johnny Werhas, 3B, 1964–1967
Jayson Werth, OF, 2004–2005
Matt West, P, 2015
Max West, OF, 1928–1929
John Wetteland, P, 1989–1991
Gus Weyhing, P, 1900
Mack Wheat, C, 1915–1919
Zack Wheat, OF, 1909–1926
Ed Wheeler, IF, 1902
Barney White, IF, 1945
Devon White, OF, 1999–2000
Larry White, P, 1983–1984
Mitch White, P, 2020–2022
Myron White, OF, 1978
Tyler White, 1B, 2019
Terry Whitfield, OF, 1984–1986
Jesse Whiting, P, 1906–1907
Dick Whitman, OF, 1946–1949
Possum Whitted, OF, 1922
Kemp Wicker, P, 1941
Joe Wieland, P, 2015
Hoyt Wilhelm, P, 1971–1972
Kaiser Wilhelm, P, 1908–1910
Rick Wilkins, C, 1999
Nick Willhite, P, 1963–1966
Dick Williams, IF/OF, 1951–1954, 1956
Eddie Williams, 1B, 1997
Jeff Williams, P, 1999–2002
Leon Williams, IF, 1926
Reggie Williams, OF, 1995
Reggie Williams, OF, 1985–1987
Stan Williams, P, 1958–1962
Todd Williams, P, 1995
Woody Williams, 2B, 1938
Maury Wills, SS, 1959–1966, 1969–1972
Bob Wilson, OF, 1958
Brian Wilson, P, 2013–2014
Eddie Wilson, OF, 1936–1937
Hack Wilson, OF, 1932–1934
Steve Wilson, P, 1991–1993
Tex Wilson, P, 1924
Tom Wilson, C, 2004
Tug Wilson, C/OF, 1884
Gordie Windhorn, OF, 1961
Jim Winford, P, 1938
Lave Winham, P, 1902
Tom Winsett, OF, 1936–1938
Hank Winston, P, 1936
Chris Withrow, P, 2013–2014
Whitey Witt, OF, 1926
Pete Wojey, P, 1954
Randy Wolf, P, 2007, 2009
Tony Wolters, C, 2022
Alex Wood, P, 2015–2018, 2020
Tracy Woodson, 3B, 1987–1989
Todd Worrell, P, 1993–1997
Gene Wright, P, 1901
Glenn Wright, SS, 1929–1933
Jamey Wright, P, 2012, 2014
Ricky Wright, P, 1982–1983
Zeke Wrigley, SS, 1899
Kelly Wunsch, P, 2005
Frank Wurm, P, 1944
Whit Wyatt, P, 1939–1944
Jimmy Wynn, OF, 1974–1975

X

Y

Ad Yale, 1B, 1905
Rube Yarrison, P, 1924
Joe Yeager, P/3B, 1898–1900
Steve Yeager, C, 1972–1985
Earl Yingling, P, 1912–1913
Delwyn Young, IF/OF, 2006–2008
Eric Young, 2B, 1992, 1997–1999
Matt Young, P, 1987
Michael Young, IF, 2013

Z

Albert Zachary, P, 1944
Tom Zachary, P, 1934–1936
Pat Zachry, P, 1983–1984
Geoff Zahn, P, 1973–1975
Todd Zeile, 3B, 1997–1998
Don Zimmer, IF, 1954–1959, 1963
Bill Zimmerman, OF, 1915
Eddie Zimmerman, 3B, 1911

External links
BR batting statistics
BR pitching statistics
Dodgers Timeline MLB
Brooklyn Dodgers (1890–1957) Sports Encyclopedia

Roster
Major League Baseball all-time rosters